Natalia Inés Gómez Junco Esteva (born 9 October 1992) is a Mexican professional footballer who plays as a midfielder for C.F. Pachuca (women) and the Mexico women's national team.

References

External links
 
 
 Natalia Gómez Junco at Tigres UANL Femenil 
 

1992 births
Living people
Footballers from Mexico City
Mexican women's footballers
Women's association football midfielders
Memphis Tigers women's soccer players
LSU Tigers women's soccer players
Natalia Gómez Junco
Natalia Gómez Junco
Primera División (women) players
Málaga CF Femenino players
Mexico women's international footballers
Mexican expatriate women's footballers
Mexican expatriate sportspeople in the United States
Expatriate women's soccer players in the United States
Expatriate women's footballers in Iceland
Mexican expatriate sportspeople in Spain
Expatriate women's footballers in Spain
Mexican expatriate football managers
Liga MX Femenil players
Association football player-managers
Mexican expatriate sportspeople in Iceland
Expatriate football managers in Iceland
Mexican footballers